Gloria Maya Musu-Scott is a Liberian politician and jurist who served as Chief Justice of the Supreme Court from 1997 until 2003.

Early life and education
Scott was born in Monrovia and is a member of the Grebo people. She has a bachelor's degree in economics and a law degree from the University of Liberia.

Career
Scott is a member of the Liberian National Bar Association and a co-founder of the Association of Female Lawyers of Liberia. She was an assistant professor at the Louis Arthur Grimes School of Law at the University of Liberia.

Scott was appointed Chief Justice of the five member Supreme Court in 1997, after the court was reconstituted following the civil war and the election of Charles Taylor. In February 2003, Scott read a ruling of the court which said it did not have legal jurisdiction over the rebel Liberians United for Reconciliation and Democracy to stop the second civil war in order to conduct a national census prior to the 2003 election. She served on the court until August 2003, when the transitional government took effect.

At the 2005 elections, Scott became the Junior Senator for Maryland County, representing the Alliance for Peace and Democracy. In 2008, she spoke to the Truth and Reconciliation Commission about the need to look further beyond the events of 1979. She lost her Senate seat in the 2011 election.

Scott was the chairperson of the Constitution Review Committee which convened from 2013 until 2015. The CRC visited all 73 electoral districts and collected a total of 56,729 views from citizens. In this role, Scott advocated for the participation of women as well as for the education of girls. Scott presented the Committee's final report to President Ellen Johnson Sirleaf in August 2015.

In 2016, Scott was named as one of a number of judges said to be bad debtors by the Liberia Banker Association, which said she had failed to pay $11,241.04 owed to the Liberian Bank for Development and Investment.

References

External links
 Interview on Constitution building

Living people
Politicians from Monrovia
Grebo people
University of Liberia alumni
Academic staff of the University of Liberia
20th-century Liberian women politicians
20th-century Liberian politicians
Alliance for Peace and Democracy (Liberia) politicians
Chief justices of Liberia
Women chief justices
Members of the Senate of Liberia
Liberian women's rights activists
Year of birth missing (living people)
21st-century Liberian women politicians
21st-century Liberian politicians
20th-century Liberian judges
21st-century Liberian judges